Hanswar is a town in the Ambedkar Nagar district of Uttar Pradesh, India, located east of Tanda. Demographically, Hanswar resembles the rest of the Purvanchal area in which it is located.

History
Hanswar, located 70-80 miles from Ayodhya, had a history dating back to the Mughal period. The ruler of the estate, Ranvijay Singh and his wife Jaikumari, vehemently opposed the construction of the Babri Masjid by Mir Baqi on Ram Janmabhoomi along with other Hindu rulers of the time. The Janmabhoomi Parisar was in control of Ranvijay Singh for 15 days well after it became part of the Babri Masjid, after which he died in battle with the Mughal Army.

Geography

Climate 

Summer (March to July) temperatures can range from 35 to 45 degrees Celsius. Winters (November to January) temperatures can range from 6 to 25 degrees Celsius. Rains occur during monsoon season (July to September).

Transport 
Hanswar has bus routes connecting to the nearby cities of New Delhi, Mumbai, Agra, Ludhiana, Ambala, Lucknow, Varanasi, Jaunpur, Allahabad, Azamgarh, Gorakhpur, Faizabad, Akbarpur, Rajesultanpur and Ghazipur.
But has no service of Uttar Pradesh Road Transport Corporation

Education 

Hira Public School
Rangey Raghav Inter College
Shiv Kumari Devi Girls Inter College Hanswar

Notable Natives and Residents 
 Masood Ahmad, Ex. MLA

Gallery

References

Cities and towns in Ambedkar Nagar district